Macroglossum neotroglodytus is a moth of the family Sphingidae. It is known from Sri Lanka, southern and north-eastern India, Nepal, southern China, Taiwan, Thailand, Malaysia (Peninsular), Indonesia (Sumatra, Java, Sulawesi) and the Philippines.

References

Macroglossum
Moths described in 2000
Moths of Japan